Marie Hedwig Auguste of Sulzbach (born: 15 April 1650 in Sulzbach; died: 23 November 1681 in Hamburg) was a Countess Palatine of Sulzbach by birth and by marriage, Archduchess of Austria and by her second marriage, Duchess of Saxe-Lauenburg.

Early life 
Hedwig was a daughter of the Duke and Count Palatine Christian August of Sulzbach (1622–1708) from his marriage to Countess Amalie of Nassau-Siegen (1613–1669), daughter of Count John VII of Nassau-Siegen.

First marriage
She was married on 3 June 1665 per cura in the court chapel of Sulzbach to Archduke Sigismund Francis of Austria-Tyrol (1630–1665), who after his brother's unexpected death had resigned from his ecclesiastical positions in order to marry. The marriage was never consummated: while travelling to meet his bride, the Archduke fell seriously ill and died in Innsbruck twelve days after the marriage.

Second marriage
Hedwig's second marriage, in Sulzbach on 9 April 1668, was with Duke Julius Francis of Saxe-Lauenburg (1641–1689). Her father had a memorial stone erected in the Sulzbach parish church to commemorate the event.

Death
Hedwig died in 1681 and was buried in the White Castle at Ostrov.

Issue 
Hedwig from her second marriage had the following children:
 Anna Maria Theresia (1670–1671)
 Anna Maria Franziska (1672–1741)
 married firstly in 1690 Count Palatine Philip William of Neuburg (1668–1693)
 married secondly 1697 Grand Duke Gian Gastone de' Medici of Tuscany (1671–1737)
 Sybille (1675–1733)
 married in 1690 Margrave Louis William of Baden-Baden (1655–1707)

References and sources 
 Theologische Quartalschrift, vol. 50, H. Laupp, 1868, p. 106 Digitized
 Johann Samuel Ersch: Allgemeine Encyclopädie der Wissenschaften und Künste, section 2 part 28, J. f. Gleditsch, 1851, p. 363

Footnotes 

House of Wittelsbach
1650 births
1681 deaths
17th-century German people
Countesses Palatine of Sulzbach
Duchesses of Saxe-Lauenburg
Austrian princesses
Daughters of monarchs
Remarried royal consorts